Eliott's Battery was an artillery battery in the British Overseas Territory of Gibraltar. The battery is located in front of the Officer's Barracks at Europa Flats between Prince George's Battery and Woodford's Battery. The battery is named after George Augustus Eliott, 1st Baron Heathfield, Governor of Gibraltar 1777–1790.

References

Batteries in Gibraltar